Lizzy Muzungu (born 6 June 1984) is a retired Zambian footballer.

She played for a Zambian girls' team All Kabwata Girls, which triumphed in several editions of the Norway Cup. In 2000 she was selected to sit beside Crown Prince Haakon at a Norway Cup banquet. She was allowed to migrate to Norway to play football, first for Asker's youth teams. By 2005 she played in Toppserien for IF Liungen. Following relegation, she returned to 2007 Toppserien when transferring to IK Grand Bodø. She later returned to Asker.

Muzungu was capped for Zambia.

References

1984 births
Living people
Zambian women's footballers
Zambia women's international footballers
IK Grand Bodø players
Toppserien players
Asker Fotball players
Zambian expatriate footballers
Expatriate footballers in Norway
Zambian emigrants to Norway
Women's association footballers not categorized by position